was a Japanese daimyō of the early Edo period. He ruled the Inuyama Domain. According to legend, he was involved in a 1611 plot by Tokugawa Ieyasu to assassinate Toyotomi Hideyori, son and intended successor of Toyotomi Hideyoshi, through use of a poisoned manjū. Though the story has been historically discounted, it remains immortalized in a kabuki play.

References

 Turnbull, Stephen (1998). The Samurai Sourcebook. London: Cassell & Co.

Daimyo
Samurai
1542 births
1611 deaths